Reggie Paul Bagala (July 8, 1965 – April 9, 2020) was an American politician who served in the Louisiana House of Representatives as a member of the Republican Party for four months.

Early life and education
Bagala was born on July 8, 1965, and graduated from Louisiana State University in 1989.

Career

From 2014 to 2017, Bagala served as the Lafourche Parish administrator and as director of the Office of Community Services before being fired by Lafourche Parish President Jimmy Cantrelle after Bagala refused to call council members about an insurance policy. However, he was hired by the council to serve as its auditor. He later filed a lawsuit against Cantrelle for violating his First Amendment rights, but his lawsuit was dismissed in 2019.

In 2019, Bagala was elected to represent the open 54th district in the Louisiana House of Representatives. Incumbent Representative Jerry "Truck" Gisclair, a Democrat, was term-limited and could not seek re-election.

Death
On April 1, 2020, Bagala tested positive for COVID-19 and was hospitalized in Raceland, Louisiana. On April 9, Bagala died at the age of 54. On July 11, a special election was held to replace the vacancy in the House of Representatives created by Bagala's death in which Joseph Orgeron won.

References

External links
 Reggie Bagala website
 at ballotpedia.org

1965 births
2020 deaths
21st-century American politicians
Deaths from the COVID-19 pandemic in Louisiana
Louisiana State University alumni
Republican Party members of the Louisiana House of Representatives
Place of birth missing